The Asian Footballer of the Year awards are annual prizes awarded to the best Asian player in a calendar year.

History
A football handbook took a poll about who was the best Asian footballer in 1985, and this poll is regarded as the origin of the Asian footballer award. However, it was not a selection of clear process or official organization, and is generally excluded from the list. The award began in 1988 through International Federation of Football History & Statistics (IFFHS) with sport magazines and journalists, then the presenter was changed to the Asian Football Confederation (AFC) in 1994.

Since 2005, the award gives its qualification to nominees who attend the awards ceremony, and so the rule caused much controversy about excluding players who could not attend the ceremony by playing for European clubs. Among them, Park Ji-sung and Shunsuke Nakamura were nominated for Ballon d'Or. The AFC is awarding the "Asian International Player of the Year" award to reduce the controversy since 2012, but AFC awards were still having problems that the process and criteria of selection were obscure. Eventually, the "Best Footballer in Asia" award inspired by Ballon d'Or was made in 2013.

When continental confederations including AFC cancelled their awards ceremony due to the COVID-19 pandemic in 2020, IFFHS restarted to select the Players of the Year about the world and each continent.

Titan Sports award 

The Best Footballer in Asia is an annual association football award organized and presented by Titan Sports. It is awarded to Asian player or AFC club's player who has the best performance in a calendar year.

Inspired by Ballon d'Or and France Football, the editorial team of Titan Sports decided to launch an award in honor of the player deemed to have performed the best in Asian football over the previous year. This award was founded in 2013. The winner is voted by a panel of football journalists, the majority of whom are from nations/regions corresponding to national associations of Asian Football Confederation, while the others are from media outlets of non-AFC nations/regions.

Multiple winners

AFC award 

The AFC Player of the Year is an annual prize presented by Asian Football Confederation (AFC). It is awarded to the Asian player who has the best performance at AFC club(s) in a calendar year.

Winners

Multiple winners

AFC award (international) 

The AFC Asian International Player of the Year is an annual prize presented by Asian Football Confederation (AFC). It is awarded to the Asian player who has the best performance outside Asia in a calendar year.

Winners

Multiple winners

IFFHS award 

The IFFHS Asia's Footballer of the Year is an annual prize presented by International Federation of Football History & Statistics (IFFHS). It had originally been the predecessor of the AFC Player of the Year, but was revived in 2020.

Winners

Multiple winners

See also
 Best Footballer in Asia
 International Federation of Football History & Statistics
 Asian Football Confederation
 AFC Annual Awards

Notes

References

External links
 Asian Player of the Year at RSSSF

Asian Football Confederation trophies and awards
Asian AFC
Footballer